Jacques Delepaut (11 September 1926 – 13 October 1992) was a French footballer. He was born in Tourcoing (Nord). He played as a defender for CO Roubaix-Tourcoing and Lille OSC in the 1950s. He was caretaker manager of Lille from December 1958 to June 1959.

Honours 
 B International

References 

French footballers
Lille OSC players
French football managers
Lille OSC managers
1926 births
1992 deaths
Sportspeople from Tourcoing
CO Roubaix-Tourcoing players
Association football defenders
Footballers from Hauts-de-France
20th-century French people